A-1 Yola is the tenth studio album by Esham. Released in 2005, it was the first hip hop album to be released with a DVD containing music video for each song. A-1 Yola is the final of three albums by the rapper on Psychopathic Records, following Repentance and the compilation Acid Rain.

Lyrics and music
Allrovi wrote, "During the course of A-1 YOLA, Esham takes the form of street hustler, kingpin, vampire, and all sorts of underworld characters, injecting his undiluted personality into each three- to four-minute sketch. His sonic backdrop remains raw but fresh, drawing an impressive amount of energy out of sparse beats." According to Esham, he was sent receipts from fans who claimed that the album's bass-heavy sound blew out subwoofers, fried amplifiers and shattered rear windshields.

Music videos 

The album came with a bonus DVD which contained music videos for almost all of the album's songs, excluding "Enemies", "Gangsta Dedication" and "?". The video for "Justa Hustler" was reissued on the 2007 Psychopathic DVD Psychopathic: The Videos.

Reception

Allrovi wrote, "Fifteen years after a teenaged Esham made his recorded debut, [...] his sordid tales show no sign of losing potency". The album peaked at #176 on the Billboard 200 and #48 on Top R&B/Hip Hop Albums.

Track listing

References

2005 albums
Albums produced by Esham
Esham albums
Psychopathic Records albums